Count Semyon Romanovich Vorontsov (or Woronzow, ; 26 June 17449 July 1832) was a Russian diplomat from the aristocratic Russian Vorontsov family, whose siblings included Alexander Vorontsov, Elizaveta Vorontsova and Yekaterina Vorontsova-Dashkova, the closest female friend of Catherine the Great.

He resided in Britain for the last 47 years of his life, from 1785 until his death in 1832, during which time he was the Russian ambassador to the Kingdom of Great Britain from 1785 to 1800 and to the United Kingdom from 1801 to 1806.

Life and career
Vorontsov's parents were Roman Larionovich Vorontsov (1717–1783) and Marfa Ivanovna Surmina (1718–1745).

He distinguished himself during the first Russo-Turkish War at Larga and Kagula in 1770. In 1783, he was appointed Russian minister at Vienna, but in 1785 was transferred to London. Vorontsov soon attained great influence and authority in Great Britain. 
Quickly acquainting himself with the characteristics of English institutions, with their ways and methods, he was able to render important services to his country. Thus, during the second Russo-Turkish War, 1787-1792 he contributed to bring about the disarmament of the auxiliary British fleet, which had been fitted out to assist the Turks; and in 1793 obtained a renewal of the commercial treaty between Great Britain and Russia. Over the next three years, he irritated Empress Catherine II with his vehement advocacy of the exiled Bourbons, sharp criticism of the Armed Neutrality of the North, which he considered disadvantageous to Russia, and denunciation of the partitions of Poland as contrary to the first principles of equity and a shock to the conscience of Western Europe.

On the accession of Paul I in 1796, Vorontsov was raised to the rank of ambassador extraordinary and minister plenipotentiary and was awarded immense estates in Finland. Neither Vorontsov's detention of the Russian squadron under Makarov in British ports nor his refusal, after the death of Alexander Bezborodko, to accept the dignity of imperial chancellor could alienate the favor of Paul. On December 28, 1796, Vorontsov had a private audience of George III to notify him of the death of Catherine the Great and Paul's accession. It was only when the emperor himself began to draw nearer to France that he began to consider Vorontsov as incompetent to serve Russia in England, and in February 1800 all the count's estates were confiscated. Alexander I on his accession in 1801 at once reinstated him, but ill health and family affairs induced him to resign his post in 1806. From that time till his death in 1832, he continued to live in London. Greville noted in his diary on 3 December 1829, ”Old Woronzow was Ambassador here many years, has lived here ever since, and never learnt a word of English.”

Besides his valuable Note on the Russian War and numerous letters, Vorontsov was the author of an autobiography and Notes on the Internal Government of Russia.

Vorontsov married Ekaterina Alekseevna Seniavina.  His son Michael continued his father's Anglophile ways and was an eminent commander in the war against Napoleon and in the Russian subjugation of the Caucasus. His daughter Catherine married George Herbert, 11th Earl of Pembroke, 8th Earl of Montgomery.  He was buried in the Pembroke family vault in Marylebone, London, and the street where he resided in St. John's Wood, London, is now called Woronzow Road.

References

Diplomats of the Russian Empire
Politicians of the Russian Empire
Counts of the Russian Empire
1744 births
1832 deaths
Recipients of the Order of St. George of the Third Degree
Ambassadors to Great Britain
Semyon
Ambassadors of the Russian Empire to the United Kingdom